The West Cascades Scenic Byway is a  National Scenic Byway in the U.S. state of Oregon. The route is designed to provide a tour on the west side of the Cascade Range along the east side of the Willamette Valley.

Route description
Much of the route is very sparsely populated, passing through timber regions in the Cascades.

From Estacada the route follows the valley of the Clackamas River upstream on Oregon Route 224  into the Mount Hood National Forest, then south along the Breitenbush River to Detroit on the North Santiam. It follows Oregon Route 22 along Detroit Lake to the junction of U.S. Route 20, then west a short distance on U.S. Route 20 to the junction of Oregon Route 126. It follows OR 126 south, then cuts through the mountain south to Oakridge, where it ends at an intersection with Oregon Route 58.

The route provides views of old growth fir trees and jagged volcanic peaks. The driving time is approximately 7–9 hours.

National Scenic Byways
Scenic highways in Oregon
Cascade Range
National Forest Scenic Byways
Mount Hood National Forest
Willamette National Forest
U.S. Route 20